Limnaecia stenosticha is a moth of the family Cosmopterigidae. It is found in Australia.

References

Limnaecia
Moths described in 1926
Moths of Australia
Taxa named by Alfred Jefferis Turner